Chester High School may refer to:

Chester High School (California)
Chester High School (Chester, Illinois)
Chester High School (Montana)
Chester High School (Chester, Pennsylvania)
Chester High School (South Carolina)
Chester High School (South Dakota)
Chester High School (Texas)